The  is a park with botanical garden at 1–108, Chausuyama-cho, Tennōji-ku, Osaka, Japan.

Establishments
Tennoji Zoo
Osaka Municipal Museum of Art
Greenhouse
Keitakuen
Chausuyama Tomb

Tenshiba Area
Restaurants, cafes, vegetable and fruit market, FamilyMart convenience store, Futsal courts, and Kintetsu Friendly Hostel Osaka-Tennoji Park are located in the Tenshiba Area

Access
Tennoji Gate
Osaka Metro
Midosuji Line, Tanimachi Line: Tennoji Station
JR West
Yamatoji Line, Osaka Loop Line, Hanwa Line: Tennoji Station
Kintetsu
Minami Osaka Line: Osaka Abenobashi Station
Shinsekai Gate
Osaka Metro
Sakaisuji Line: Ebisucho Station
Midosuji Line, Sakaisuji Line: Dobutsuen-mae Station

History
The Park was established in 1909 after the demolished of the buildings of the Fifth National Industrial Exhibition. With the zoo following in 1919.

See also 
List of botanical gardens in Japan

References

External links 

Tennōji Park at Osaka Visitor's Guide

Botanical gardens in Japan
Gardens in Osaka Prefecture
Parks and gardens in Osaka
World's fair sites in Osaka